National Highway 327C, commonly referred to as NH 327C is a national highway in India. It is a secondary route of National Highway 27.  NH-327C runs in the state of West Bengal in India.

Route 
NH327C connects Khoribari and Ghoshpukur in the state of West Bengal.

Junctions  
 
  Terminal near Khoribari.
  Terminal near Ghoshpukur.

See also 
 List of National Highways in India
 List of National Highways in India by state

References

External links 

 NH 327C on OpenStreetMap

National highways in India
National Highways in West Bengal